Karl Fochler (1898–1982) was an Austrian actor who made over sixty film and television appearances. He featured in a number of stage productions.

Filmography

References

Bibliography
 Giesen, Rolf. Nazi Propaganda Films: A History and Filmography. McFarland, 2003.

External links

1898 births
1982 deaths
Austrian male film actors
Austrian male stage actors
20th-century Austrian male actors
Male actors from Vienna